Cho Jung-hui is a former international table tennis player from North Korea.

Table tennis career
She won three World Table Tennis Championship medals. She won a bronze medal at the 1981 World Table Tennis Championships in the Corbillon Cup (women's team event). Four years later she won a silver medal in the women's team and during the 1987 World Table Tennis Championships she won a bronze in the women's doubles with Ri Pun-hui.

References

Living people
North Korean female table tennis players
World Table Tennis Championships medalists
Year of birth missing (living people)